Everything Is Wrong may refer to:
Everything Is Wrong (album), the third studio album by American electronica musician Moby
"Everything Is Wrong" (song), by American rock band Interpol
"Everything Is Wrong", a song by Blonde Redhead from the album Penny Sparkle
"Everything's Wrong", a song by Crossfade from the album Falling Away